Spharagemon marmorata, the marbled grasshopper, is a species of band-winged grasshopper in the family Acrididae. It is found in eastern North America.

Subspecies
These subspecies belong to the species Spharagemon marmorata:
 Spharagemon marmorata marmorata (Harris, 1841) (Northern Marbled Locust)
 Spharagemon marmorata marmoratum (northern marbled grasshopper)
 Spharagemon marmorata picta (Scudder, 1877)
 Spharagemon marmorata pictum (southern marbled grasshopper)

References

External links

 

Oedipodinae